Lourdes Faberes (born ) is a Philippines-born actress based in the United Kingdom. She is best known for her work in television, theatre, and film. She played Pollution in the Amazon series Good Omens, the assassin Altani on History Channel's Knightfall, and covert operative Michelle Ito on ABC's series, Whiskey Cavalier. In 2021 she appeared on the Bond film, No Time to Die, and in 2022 played Kate Flecher in The Sandman TV series.

Early life and theatre
Lourdes Faberes was born and raised in Manila, Philippines.  She moved to the United Kingdom in 1997, and studied and gained an MA in Performance (Advanced Theatre Practice) at the Royal Central School of Speech and Drama.

Faberes has stated that her mother wanted "overachieving children". Although her parents first suggested that she become a lawyer, her mother brought Faberes to various extracurricular activities, including tennis, embroidery, and arms and ammunition. She was first introduced to acting when her mother took her to the National Theatre in the Philippines to improve her elocution. Her acting debut was in a production of The King and I in 1991. Faberes performed for the Philippines repertory company in Miss Saigon. Now residing in London, she has performed with an extensive career in many of London's top theatres.

Career
Lourdes Faberes made her screen acting debut in the 'ensemble' of the television series Great Performances,  production of Jesus Christ Superstar.  In 2004, Faberes starred as Isabel Liu, a Flight Dynamics Officer [Fido], from mission control in the BBC's Space Odyssey: Voyage to the Planets. Since then, Lourdes Faberes has clocked numerous TV series appearances as well as major roles in many short films.
Recent years have seen her progress when landing a more regular slot in 2018 for Season 1 of Knightfall as Altani. In 2019, Lourdes followed this with further regular appearances, as Sister Li in Season 1 of Grenslanders (Floodlands), a Dutch-Belgian TV series,  and as "Pollution", one of the four Horsemen of the Apocalypse in the Amazon Neil Gaiman and Terry Pratchett TV series Good Omens.

Lourdes appeared as a SPECTRE agent in the Bond film, No Time to Die.

In 2022, she appeared as Kate Fletcherin in an episode of The Sandman.

Filmography

Film

Television

Awards and nominations

References

External links

Lourdes Faberes Agent: Cam.co.uk
LFCC 2019 - Lourdes Faberes interview with PuddyGeeks

1970s births
Living people
People from Manila
21st-century Filipino actresses
21st-century British actresses
Filipino emigrants to England
British stage actresses
Filipino stage actresses
Filipino film actresses
Filipino television actresses
British film actresses
British television actresses
Alumni of the Royal Central School of Speech and Drama